North Bellport is a hamlet and census-designated place (CDP) located within the Town of Brookhaven, New York, United States. The population was 11,545 at the 2010 census.

History
North Bellport was built by the Hagerman Land Company, named after the neighboring hamlet of Hagerman. Originally a predominantly white community, North Bellport was blockbusted during the early 1960s, resulting in a major influx of African Americans into the community. In 1962, the community was the subject of first of several notable court cases concerning the practice of blockbusting by real estate agents in New York.

Geography

Demographics

As of the census of 2000, there were 9,007 people, 2,349 households, and 2,036 families residing in the CDP. The population density was 1,937.7 per square mile (747.9/km2). There were 2,520 housing units at an average density of 542.1/sq mi (209.2/km2). The racial makeup of the CDP was 15% White, 60% African American, 1.50% Native American, 1.98% Asian, 0.07% Pacific Islander, 7.28% from other races, and 5.14% from two or more races. Hispanic or Latino of any race were 30% of the population.

There were 2,349 households, out of which 49.5% had children under the age of 18 living with them, 57.1% were married couples living together, 23.6% had a female householder with no husband present, and 13.3% were non-families. 8.9% of all households were made up of individuals, and 2.8% had someone living alone who was 65 years of age or older. The average household size was 3.75 and the average family size was 3.91.

In the CDP, the population was spread out, with 33.6% under the age of 18, 10.3% from 18 to 24, 29.6% from 25 to 44, 20.2% from 45 to 64, and 6.4% who were 65 years of age or older. The median age was 30 years. For every 100 females, there were 96.3 males. For every 100 females age 18 and over, there were 91.7 males.

The median income for a household in the CDP was $55,145, and the median income for a family was $56,140. Males had a median income of $38,099 versus $27,939 for females. The per capita income for the CDP was $16,733. About 11.5% of families and 15.5% of the population were below the poverty line, including 22.6% of those under age 18 and 7.4% of those age 65 or over.

Education

School district 
North Bellport is located entirely within the boundaries of the South Country Central School District. As such, all children residing in North Bellport who attend public schools go to South Country's schools.

Library district 
North Bellport is located within the boundaries of the South Country Library District.

Transportation 
The Long Island Rail Road's Bellport station on the Montauk Branch is located within the hamlet.

References

Brookhaven, New York
Hamlets in New York (state)
Census-designated places in New York (state)
Census-designated places in Suffolk County, New York
Hamlets in Suffolk County, New York